Kanab Municipal Airport  is in Kane County, Utah, two miles south of the city of Kanab, which owns it.  The FAA's National Plan of Integrated Airport Systems for 2009–2013 categorized as a general aviation facility.

Facilities
Its one runway, 1/19, is 6,193 by 75 feet (1,888 x 23 m) asphalt.

In 2006 the airport had 8,560 aircraft operations, average 23 per day: 99% general aviation and 1% air taxi. 17 aircraft were then based at the airport: 94.1% single-engine and 5.9% multi-engine.

References

External links 
 Aerial image as of 1 June 1997 from USGS The National Map
 
 

Airports in Utah
Buildings and structures in Kanab, Utah
Transportation in Kane County, Utah